Gruni may refer to several villages in Romania:

 Gruni, a village in Cornereva Commune, Caraş-Severin County
 Gruni, a village in Belinţ Commune, Timiș County

See also
 Gruny (disambiguation)